Caloptilia dondavisi is a moth of the family Gracillariidae. It is known from the Galápagos Islands.

The larvae feed on Rhynchosia minima. They mine the leaves of their host plant.

References

dondavisi
Gracillariidae of South America
Moths described in 2006